Shinya Inoue may refer to:

Shinya Inoué, professor
Inoue Chikaya, film editor